Rafael Nadal defeated Maxime Cressy in the final, 7–6(8–6), 6–3 to win the men's singles title at the 2022 Melbourne Summer Set 1. It was his 89th career ATP title. Cressy entered the tournament as a qualifier and was contesting his first tour-level final.

This was the first edition of the tournament.

Seeds 
The top four seeds received a bye into the second round.

Draw

Finals

Top half

Bottom half

Qualifying

Seeds

Qualifiers

Lucky losers

Qualifying draw

First qualifier

Second qualifier

Third qualifier

Fourth qualifier

See also  
 2022 Melbourne Summer Set 2

References

External links 
  Main draw
 Qualifying draw

Melbourne Summer Set 1 - Men's Singles